The 2021 Mount Panorama 500 (know for commercial purpose as the 2021 Repco Mount Panorama 500) was a motor racing event held as a part of the 2021 Supercars Championship from Friday 26 February to Sunday 28 February 2021. The event was held at the Mount Panorama Circuit in Bathurst, New South Wales and was the first time the event was held since 1996. It was the first round of the 2021 Supercars Championship and consisted of two races of 250 kilometres.

The race was supported by the opening rounds of the Super 2 Series and the Touring Car Masters.

Results

Race 1

Race 2

Championship standings after the race

Drivers' Championship standings

Teams'' Championship standings

 Note: Only the top five positions are included for both sets of standings.

References

Mount Panorama 500
Mount Panorama 500
Motorsport in Bathurst, New South Wales